Ryan Cameron Coxon (born 30 September 1997) is a New Zealand rugby union player who plays for the Tasman Mako in the Bunnings NPC competition. His position of choice is prop.

Professional career
Coxon made his debut for Mitre 10 Cup side  in 2017. He was named in the 2020  squad but only played 2 games in the season. Coxon was part of the  side that won the Mitre 10 Cup for the second time in a row in 2020. Despite coming off probably his best provincial campaign yet he was not named in the  squad for the 2021 Super Rugby season. In Round 4 of the 2021 Bunnings NPC Coxon suffered a season ending injury while playing for Tasman against . The Mako went on to make the final before again losing to  23–20.

References

1997 births
Living people
Chiefs (rugby union) players
Crusaders (rugby union) players
New Zealand rugby union players
Rugby union players from Hamilton, New Zealand
Rugby union props
Tasman rugby union players